"(Waiting For) The Ghost-Train" is a single by Madness. Released in 1986 shortly after the band announced they were to split, it was their last single prior to reforming in 1992. It spent nine weeks in the UK charts, peaking at number 18. The song first appeared on an album on the band's 1986's Utter Madness greatest hits compilation, issued one month after its single release.

The song was written by Suggs about apartheid in South Africa, with its chorus "It's black and white, don't try to hide it" and the line "The station master's writing with a piece of orange chalk / One hundred cancellations, still no one wants to walk" (in reference to the South African flag). Mike Barson reunited with the other members of the band to record this song, although he did not appear in the music video.

A Christmas flexi-disc record containing the 'band demo' of the song was sent out to Madness fan club (M.I.S.) members, featuring farewells and thanks from each member of the band (except Barson).

Critical reception
Upon its release, Anna Martin of Number One stated: "Reminiscent of the classic sound of "Grey Day" and "The Sun and the Rain", the chorus follows in the great tradition of sing-a-long-ability and ends in a big, sweeping crescendo that signals the end." Simon Mills of Smash Hits related the song to the band's recent material of that time: "Their "farewell single" is more of the same doomy stuff about an unfortunate bunch of folk who are all waiting for this train that never comes. Life's like that isn't it?"

Track listing

7": Virgin / JAZZ 9 (UK) 
Side one
"(Waiting For) The Ghost-Train" - 3:41
Side two
"Maybe in Another Life" - 3:00

12": Virgin / JAZZ 9 12 (UK) 
Side one
"(Waiting For) The Ghost-Train" - 3:41
"Maybe in Another Life" - 2:59
Side two
"Seven Year Scratch" - 8:39

Charts

Notes

External links
 discogs.com for artist discography

1986 singles
Madness (band) songs
Songs written by Suggs (singer)
Song recordings produced by Clive Langer
Song recordings produced by Alan Winstanley
Zarjazz singles
1986 songs